Alpha Apodis (Alpha Aps, α Apodis, α Aps) is the brightest star in the southern circumpolar constellation of Apus, with an apparent magnitude of approximately 3.825. It had the Greek alpha designation as part of the constellation which Johann Bayer called Apis Indica in his 1603 Uranometria star atlas. With a declination of –79°, this is a circumpolar star for much of the southern hemisphere. It can be identified on the night sky by drawing an imaginary line through Alpha Centauri and Alpha Circini then extending it toward the south celestial pole.

This is a giant star with a stellar classification of K2.5III, indicating that this star has consumed the hydrogen at its core and has evolved away from the main sequence. It has expanded to an estimated radius of about 48 times the radius of the Sun and is emitting 980 times the Sun's luminosity. The photosphere has an effective temperature of 4,256 K, giving the star the characteristic orange hue of a K-type star. Based upon parallax measurements, this star is 430 ± 20 light-years from the Earth. It is not known to have a companion.

Naming

References

Apus (constellation)
K-type giants
Apodis, Alpha
129078
072370
PD-78 00893
5470